Dana Schweiger ( Carlsen; born February 29, 1968) is an American television personality, entrepreneur and a former model.

Early life 
Dana Schweiger was born in Seattle, Washington. She grew up there with her sister and her uncle.

Career 
Schweiger first studied business management and was later educated at the Esthetic Skincare Institute in Seattle as a beautician. In the 1990s, she worked for Calvin Klein and H&M as a model. In 2009, she signed an advertising contract with Katjes. In 2012, she was part of the jury of Deutschland sucht den Superstar - Kids. She is the co-founder of Bellybutton, a mail order company for children's supplies. Since 2021, Schweiger is ambassador of WW.

Personal life 
Schweiger married actor Til Schweiger on June 19, 1995. They have four children: Valentin Florian Schweiger (b. 1995), Luna Marie Schweiger (b. 1997), Lilli Camille Schweiger (b. 1998), and Emma Tiger Schweiger (b. 2002). Schweiger and Carlsen separated in 2005 and were divorced in 2014.

In July 2016, Schweiger publicly announced that she would renounce her American citizenship if Donald Trump won the US presidential election in November that year.

Filmography 
 1995: Lindenstraße
 1997: Knockin' on Heaven's Door
 1998: The Polar Bear
 2004: Pampers-TV (RTL II), 9 Sendungen
 2005: Barfuss
 2012: Simply Dana (Glitz*)
 2012: Deutschland sucht den Superstar - Kids (RTL)
 2015: Grill den Henssler (VOX)
 2016: Dance Dance Dance (RTL)
 2016: 6 Mütter: Zwischen Kind und Karriere

References

External links 

1968 births
Living people
Businesspeople from Seattle
20th-century American businesspeople
21st-century American businesspeople
American expatriates in Germany
American television hosts
American women television presenters
20th-century American businesswomen
21st-century American businesswomen